Lucas Foster (born 17 September 1999) is an American snowboarder from Telluride, Colorado. Born to Stephannie Van Damme and Steve Foster He competed at the 2022 Winter Olympics.

References

External links
  

Living people
1999 births
American male snowboarders
Olympic snowboarders of the United States
Snowboarders at the 2022 Winter Olympics
People from Telluride, Colorado
Sportspeople from Colorado
21st-century American people